American Aristocracy is a 1916 American silent adventure/comedy-drama film directed by Lloyd Ingraham and starring Douglas Fairbanks. A 35mm print of the film is preserved at the George Eastman House and is currently in the public domain.

Cast 
Douglas Fairbanks as Cassius Lee
Jewel Carmen as Geraldine Hicks
Charles DeLima as Leander Hicks
Albert Parker as Percy Horton
Artie Ortego as Delgado

References

External links 

 

1916 films
1910s adventure comedy-drama films
American adventure comedy-drama films
American silent feature films
American black-and-white films
Triangle Film Corporation films
Articles containing video clips
Films directed by Lloyd Ingraham
Surviving American silent films
1910s English-language films
1910s American films
Silent adventure comedy-drama films
Silent American comedy-drama films